The Lisbon Falls are falls in the Lisbon Creek, a right bank tributary of the Blyde River. They are situated a short distance north of Graskop beside the R532 road, and are the highest waterfalls in Mpumalanga, South Africa.
 
Located close to God's Window, they are however just outside the Blyde River Canyon Nature Reserve, as several others like the Berlin Falls, Lone Creek and Mac-Mac Falls. The falls are situated along the Panorama Route.

References

External links
 South African Tourism: The Lisbon Falls, Mpumalanga

Waterfalls of South Africa